Elizabeth Finch is a novel by Julian Barnes, published in 2022.

References

2022 British novels
Novels by Julian Barnes